Konark Institute of Science and Technology (KIST)  is a private engineering college in Bhubaneswar, Orissa in India. It was founded by the Vidya Sagar Charitable Trust in 2001. With the approval of the AICTE, KIST was affiliated with Utkal University, Vanivihar, Bhubaneshwar. Later it became affiliated with Biju Patnaik University of Technology in the year 2003–04.

Master of Business Administration  
Master of Business Administration (MBA) 60

Master of Applied Management 
Master of Applied Management (MAM) 60

References

External links 
 CCSR 2013 
 Konark Institute of Science and Technology
 BPUT colleges list from BPUT

 

Private engineering colleges in India
All India Council for Technical Education
Engineering colleges in Odisha
Universities and colleges in Bhubaneswar
Science and technology in Bhubaneswar
Colleges affiliated with Biju Patnaik University of Technology
Educational institutions established in 2001
2001 establishments in Orissa